Drayton Valley-Devon is a provincial electoral district in Alberta, Canada. The district was created in the 2010 boundary redistribution and is mandated to return a single member to the Legislative Assembly of Alberta using the first past the post voting system. Drayton Valley-Devon is currently represented by United Conservative Party MLA Mark Smith who was first elected in 2015.

History
The electoral district was created in the 2010 Alberta boundary re-distribution. It was created from the old electoral district of Drayton Valley-Calmar which was expanded east into land that was part of the Leduc-Beaumont-Devon riding to include the town of Devon

Boundary history

Electoral history
Drayton Valley-Devon and its antecedent, Drayton Valley-Calmar, elected Progressive Conservative MLAs with solid majorities from the 1970s to 2015. Just since 2015, it has elected one person, Mark Smith, who first ran for the Wildrose party and then for the United Conservatives.

The first MLA elected to Drayton Valley-Devon was Progressive Conservative Diana McQueen who was a cabinet minister in the Allison Redford government. The current incumbent is Mark Smith a former member of the Wildrose Party who joined the United Conservative Party.

Elections

2012 general election

2015 general election

2019 general election

Senate nominee results

2012 Senate nominee election district results

Student vote results

2012 election

Registered schools 
Please note: Only schools registered under Drayton Valley-Devon have been included, as some schools within jurisdiction are registered in other ridings.

Results

References

External links
Elections Alberta
The Legislative Assembly of Alberta

Alberta provincial electoral districts